Loon Lake is a glacial lake in northern Lake County, Illinois, United States. It comprises three lakes; East Loon, West Loon, and North Loon. (North Loon is not connected).  It is located near the town of Antioch, Illinois, near the intersection of Route 83 and Grass Lake Rd. It is home to many different species of fish, birds, reptiles, and amphibians. Some of which are endangered species, including the blacknose shiner.

Hydrography 
West Loon Lake is a glacial lake that has a maximum depth of 38–44 feet. It is an extremely clear lake, transparency of the lake is 15–18 feet depending on the time of year. Water clarity has been at the highest level in 15 years.

East Loon Lake is a glacial lake that has a maximum depth of 26–28 feet. East Loon has a different ecological makeup; compared to West Loon, it is more of a nature lake then a recreational lake. The clarity of this lake is much poorer than West, only 5–7 feet.

Ecological concerns

West Loon Lake was used as a source of ice during the late 19th and early 20th century.

Invasive and non-native species have been found in Loon Lake. In August 2005 a Caiman was found in East Loon Lake. Zebra Mussel have been introduced into West and East Loon Lakes; it is not known how exactly they were introduced to the lakes, but it is suspected to come from either Lake Michigan or Geneva Lake in Wisconsin.

Although there are no immediate threats to Loon Lake, development in the area has increased the amount of pollution in the lake. Walmart during the construction of its store located in Antioch has been fined for polluting East Loon Lake.

Species 
 Largemouth bass
 Walleye
 Muskellunge
 Northern pike
 Bluegill
 Crappie
 Bowfin
 Carp
 Gar
 Channel cat
 Yellow bullhead
 Yellow perch
 Rock bass
 Pumpkinseed
 Hybrid striped bass
 Western painted turtle
 Common snapping turtle
 Bull-frog
 Leopard frog
 American toad
Warmouth

References

External links 
 Old Loon Lake Photos
 Fishing Reports/Loon Lake Blog
 West Loon Lake
 East Loon Lake
 Loon Lakes Management-Informative Loon Lake site

Lakes of Lake County, Illinois
Loon
Glacial lakes of the United States